WJMS (590 AM, "US 59") is a radio station broadcasting a full-service format of classic country music and talk. Licensed to Ironwood, Michigan, it first began broadcasting November 3, 1931 with 100 W power. It was called "The Voice of the Iron Range."

References

Sources
Michiguide.com - WJMS History

External links

JMS
Country radio stations in the United States
Radio stations established in 1931